Kamakidae is a family of amphipods belonging to the order Amphipoda.

Genera:
 Aloiloi J.L.Barnard, 1970
 Amphideutopus J.L.Barnard, 1959
 Aorcho J.L.Barnard, 1961
 Aorchoides Ledoyer, 1972
 Cerapopsis Della Valle, 1893
 Gammaropsella Myers, 1995
 Heterokamaka Ariyama, 2008
 Kamaka Derzhavin, 1923
 Ledoyerella Myers, 1973
 Natarajphotis Peethambaran, 1998
 Paraloiloi Myers, 1995

References

Corophiidea